The German–Estonian Non-Aggression Pact was signed in Berlin on June 7, 1939, by Estonian and German Foreign Ministers Karl Selter and Joachim von Ribbentrop. The German–Latvian Non-Aggression Pact was also signed on the same day. Ratifications of the German-Estonian Pact were exchanged in Berlin on July 24, 1939, and it became effective the same day. It was registered in League of Nations Treaty Series on August 12, 1939. The pact was intended for a period of ten years.

The pacts were intended to prevent the West or the Soviets from gaining influence in the Baltic states and thus encircling Germany. A non-aggression pact with Lithuania was concluded in March after the 1939 German ultimatum to Lithuania regarding the Klaipėda Region. The states were to provide a barrier against any Soviet intervention in a planned German–Polish war.

Germany offered to sign non-aggression pacts with Estonia, Latvia, Finland, Denmark, Norway and Sweden on April 28, 1939. Sweden, Norway and Finland rejected the proposal. The first drafts were prepared the first week of May, but the signing of the treaties was twice delayed by Latvia's requests for clarification.

See also
:Category:World War II treaties

References

External links 
 Text of the treaty

1939 in Estonia
1939 in Germany
Treaties of Estonia
World War II treaties
Treaties concluded in 1939
Treaties entered into force in 1939
Treaties of Nazi Germany
Non-aggression pacts